Michael Patrick Carroll (born April 8, 1958) is an American Republican Party politician from New Jersey.  He represented the 25th Legislative District in the New Jersey General Assembly, first taking office in 1996. Carroll did not run for re-election in 2019, choosing instead to run for Morris County Surrogate, though he lost the Republican Party primary for Surrogate to Morris County Freeholder Heather Darling.

Early life 
Carroll was born in Fayetteville, North Carolina, on April 8, 1958, the son of Maurice C. and Margaret W. Carroll.  Although his parents resided in New Jersey, his father's military service carried him to Fort Bragg at the time of his son's birth.  Both of Carroll's parents are former reporters, his father having written for the New York Herald Tribune, The New York Times and Newsday, while his mother wrote for the Daily Record. His father has been the director of the Quinnipiac University Polling Institute. He is of German and Irish descent. Carroll moved with his family to Morris Township, New Jersey in 1960. Carroll attended public school in the Morris School District through grammar school, then Delbarton School, from which he graduated in 1976.  He attended Johns Hopkins University, earning a B.A. in Social and Behavioral Sciences in 1980.  He pursued his legal education at Rutgers School of Law–Newark, receiving his J.D. in 1983. While at Johns Hopkins, Carroll served as the Region II Co-Director for the College Republican National Federation and held various offices in the Johns Hopkins Republican Club, including President.  In 1978, he interned in the offices of Congressman Jack Kemp.  During law school, he served briefly as an aide to State Senator John Dorsey. He also founded the Morris County Young Republicans, serving as the Chairman of that group for four years.  He was first elected to the Morris County Republican Committee for Morris Township in 1980.  In 1984, after moving to Morristown, he was elected to the Republican County Committee there, serving as chairman for one term.  Returning to Morris Township, he was once again elected to the Republican County Committee, a position he presently holds.  He is also a Member of the Knights of Columbus, the Federalist Society and the Friendly Sons of Saint Patrick.

New Jersey Assembly 
Carroll first ran for the Assembly in 1993 using as his campaign slogan "Roll Back Florio's Taxes" and pledging to work for the complete repeal of Governor James Florio's entire 1990 tax increases; he lost that election by fewer than 400 votes to incumbent Assemblyman Arthur R. Albohn (then-Assemblyman Rodney Frelinghuysen received the most votes in the primary). When Albohn retired in 1995, Carroll and Anthony Bucco, who was appointed to the Assembly after Frelinghuysen's election to Congress, prevailed in a Republican primary against Rick Merkt, Chris Christie, and two others, going onto victory in the fall. Upon his election to the Assembly, Carroll served on the Judiciary and State Government Committees. Over the course of the next nine terms, he also served on the Health, Regulatory Oversight, Human Services, Law and Public Safety, Housing and Local Government, and Higher Education Committees. At present, he sits on the Judiciary Committee and the State and Local Government Committee. He served as Republican Parliamentarian from 2002 to 2005, and again from 2012 to the present. He also served of the State Human Relations Commission, the Sentencing Review Commission, the New Jersey Lincoln Bicentennial Commission, and as the Assembly Republican Liaison to the State Historical Commission. For the 2018-19 session, Carroll has been assigned to serve on the Higher Education Committee, the Judiciary Committee and the State and Local Government Committee. During the term of Governor Christine Todd Whitman, Carroll became one of her most consistent Republican critics, voting against all but one of her budgets. He and fellow conservatives, including Marion Crecco, Scott Garrett, Guy R. Gregg, Rick Merkt, and Guy Talarico formed a loose-knit coalition dubbed by the press "The Mountain Men" for their conservative stances. Carroll was among only a handful of Assembly Members Legislators to vote against Governor Whitman's "Pension Bond" proposal. He and fellow conservatives were early opponents of Governor Whitman's proposal to raise the gasoline tax and they have, ever since, taken credit for killing that initiative. Along with Rick Merkt and others, Carroll was an early proponent of ending defined benefit pension plans and warned against the looming crisis of unfunded liabilities in the 1990s. Carroll was also among the earliest opponents of HOV lanes along Interstate 287 and Interstate 80 (created as a result of an initiative by Senator Frank Lautenberg). When they were finally abolished, local media proclaimed him one of the "heroes" in the fight against those lanes. While serving with the Republican majority, Carroll secured passage of a bill which exempted the first $500,000 of profit from the sale of a couple's home from state income tax. He proposed a Bill to mandate the reading, in school each morning, of a section of the Declaration of Independence. Assemblyman Carroll has never voted for a single tax increase. The April 2003 issue of New Jersey Monthly magazine cited Carroll as the "Most Conservative" member of the New Jersey Legislature. The magazine cited Carroll's "...missionary zeal and his talent for articulating his stances on behalf of individual and property rights, the sanctity of family—including unborn children—and the cult of Reaganism..." in elaborating on their choice. . Carroll is one of the prime sponsors of a proposal to name a stretch of highway in Morris County after Ronald Reagan.  A longtime opponent of what he characterizes as "judicial usurpation of the legislative function", Carroll introduced proposals to amend the New Jersey Constitution to reverse the affordable housing mandate contained in the Mount Laurel doctrine, to repeal the school funding decisions that created Abbott districts and to preclude the judiciary from imposing any requirement that the Legislature raise taxes or spend money.  A strong proponent of Second Amendment rights and freedoms, Carroll sponsors a proposal to repeal New Jersey's present statutes and replace them with laws akin to those extant in Vermont. He has also sponsored proposals requiring that no tax increase be imposed absent a super-majority of legislative votes; to limit the salaries of state and local officials; and to preclude governmental workers from participation in partisan politics.

Committees 
Higher Education
Judiciary
State and Local Government
Joint Committee on Housing and Affordability

Personal life 
An attorney admitted to the Bar in 1983, Carroll practices in Morristown. A general practitioner with a focus on family law, appellate practice, municipal and land use law, he represents the Montville Planning Board. He also taught business law at County College of Morris for several years as an adjunct professor at Rutgers Law School, Newark. In 1983, Carroll married Sharon, née Anderson, whom he met when the two of them worked together at McDonald's. The couple has six children: Sean Michael, James Patrick, Brian Christopher, Jane Eleanor, Benjamin Franklin, and Robert Edward Lee. Carroll has often appeared at Junior State of America conventions in New Jersey, including a conference at Princeton University in October 2008 and another in March 2009.

Electoral history

New Jersey Assembly

References

External links 
Assemblyman Carroll's legislative web page, New Jersey Legislature
New Jersey Legislature financial disclosure forms
2016 2015 2014 2013 2012 2011 2010 2009 2008 2007 2006 2005 2004
Assemblyman Carroll's Campaign Website
Assembly Member Michael Patrick Carroll, Project Vote Smart
New Jersey Voter Information Website 2003
Rep. Scott Garrett Biography
The Federalist Society
The NJ Mountain Men
Morris County Republican Committee

1958 births
Living people
Delbarton School alumni
Johns Hopkins University alumni
Republican Party members of the New Jersey General Assembly
New Jersey lawyers
Politicians from Fayetteville, North Carolina
Politicians from Morris County, New Jersey
People from Morris Township, New Jersey
Rutgers School of Law–Newark alumni
21st-century American politicians